The 1998 Argentine motorcycle Grand Prix was the last round of the 1998 Grand Prix motorcycle racing season. It took place on 25 October 1998 at the Autódromo Oscar Alfredo Gálvez in Buenos Aires.

This race was known as being the final 500 cc victory for Australian Mick Doohan.

500 cc classification

250 cc classification

125 cc classification

Championship standings after the race (500cc)

Below are the standings for the top five riders and constructors after round fourteen has concluded. 

Riders' Championship standings

Constructors' Championship standings

 Note: Only the top five positions are included for both sets of standings.

References

Argentine Republic motorcycle Grand Prix
Argentine
Motorcycle Grand Prix